Al-Amiri may refer to:
 Abu al-Hassan al-Amiri (died 992), Iranian Islamic philosopher in the Kindi tradition
 Hadi Al-Amiri (born 1954), head of the Badr Organization, military wing of the Supreme Islamic Iraqi Council (SIIC); Iraqi member of parliament
 Najiha Al-Amiri (born 1956), Iraqi politician 
 Saheb al-Amiri (died 2006), Muqtada al-Sadr's top aide, killed in a raid by U.S. troops